Arif Shaqirin bin Suhaimi (born 13 March 2000) is a Malaysian footballer who plays as a midfielder for Malaysia Super League club Perak on loan from Kuala Lumpur City.

International career
Arif represented Malaysian at various youth levels.

Career statistics

Club

Honour

Club
Kuala Lumpur City
 Malaysia Cup: 2021
 AFC Cup runner-up: 2022

References

External links
 

2000 births
Living people
People from Terengganu
Kuala Lumpur City F.C. players
Perak F.C. players
Malaysian footballers
Association football midfielders
Malaysia Super League players